The 2002 World Fencing Championships were held in Lisbon, Portugal. The event took place from August 18 to August 23, 2002.

Overview
Lisbon obtained the right to organize the championships over Bari, Italy. The event was first to take place from August 12 to August 18, but was reported a week later at the request of the main sponsor and of the television stations, which feared poor audience figures.

84 countries–a record at the time–took part in the championships. The competition saw the clear domination of Russia, who came away with nine medals, including six golds. Stanislav Pozdniakov and Svetlana Boyko obtained a double gold haul respectively in men's sabre and women's foil. Boiko shared the podium with teammate Yekaterina Yusheva, who in quarter-finals had put an end to Valentina Vezzali's streak of gold medals in 1999, 2000, and 2001. Pavel Kolobkov earned a gold medal in men's épée, eight years after his last major title and with a very limited preparation: he was then working as a fencing coach in Boston and rarely took part in Fencing World Cup events. Russia also prevailed in women's team sabre, overcoming Hungary in the final. Ironically, these two countries were the most adamant against the introduction of women's sabre at the Olympics.

The Lisbon championships proved however a disappointment for France, whose medals tally dropped from ten at Nîmes 2001 to five. The French preparation for the championships had been affected by a personal conflict between Philippe Omnès, director of fencing of the French federation, and Christian Bauer, national coach for sabre, as well as the positive drugs test of Laura Flessel-Colovic a few days before the competition. France boasted only one gold medal in men's team épée, won against Russia.

The remaining medals were relatively spread out between other nations. Romania claimed three bronze medals: one in women's team foil, Laura Badea's first medal after her return from maternity leave, one in men's sabre for Olympic champion Mihai Covaliu and one in women's épée for 17-year-old Ana Maria Brânză. The main surprise however was the growing power of Asian fencing: Korea's Hyun Hee defeated successively favourites Laura Flessel and Imke Duplitzer to earn the gold in women's épée, while China's Tan Xue claimed the title after seeing of previous incumbents Anne-Lise Touya and Elena Jemayeva.

Medal table

Medal summary

Men's events

Women's events

References

Sources
FIE Results
 
 

World Fencing Championships
World Fencing Championships
World Fencing Championships, 2002
Sports competitions in Lisbon
International fencing competitions hosted by Portugal
World Fencing Championships
World Fencing Championships